
Gmina Olszanka is a rural gmina (administrative district) in Brzeg County, Opole Voivodeship, in south-western Poland.

Villages
Gmina Olszanka contains the villages and settlements of Czeska Wieś, Gierszowice, Jankowice Wielkie, Janów, Krzyżowice, Michałów, Obórki, Olszanka, Pogorzela and Przylesie.

Neighbouring gminas
Gmina Olszanka is bordered by the gminas of Grodków, Lewin Brzeski, Niemodlin, Skarbimierz and Wiązów.

References

Olszanka
Gmina Olszanka